The Aero Espresso Italiana, called also AEI and Aeroespresso del Levante, was the first airline of the Kingdom of Italy. It was created as a private company for the route Brindisi-Athens-Istanbul; later a second route to Rodhes was added

History

The airline company, founded in Rome in December 1923, was operating with flights only from 1926. It was based in Rome and worked, as was customary in the period, with services of passenger transport and international air mail in the 1920s and early 1930s.

In the early 1930s Aero Espresso Italiana had two flights toward eastern Europe:
 Brindisi – Athens – Istanbul/Costantinopole
 Brindisi – Athens – Rodi

The AEI used mainly the flying boats Savoia 55, but also the Macchi 24bis and Dornier.

The AEI remained active until its absorption, in 1934, by the national airline Ala Littoria (that was formed by a merger of Società Aerea Mediterranea (SAM), Società Anonima Navigazione Aerea (SANA), Società Italiana Servizi Aerei (SISA) and Aero Espresso Italiana).

Notes

Bibliography

 Flying Magazine. May 1929. 112 pages; Vol. 4, No. 5 ISSN 0015-4806
 Taylor, Michael J. H. (1989). Jane's Encyclopedia of Aviation. London: Studio Editions.

See also

 List of defunct airlines of Italy
 Ala Littoria
 Società Anonima Navigazione Aerea

Defunct airlines of Italy
Airlines established in 1923
Italian companies established in 1923
Airlines disestablished in 1934
1934 disestablishments in Italy
Defunct seaplane operators